Aha! (legally Aha! Travel Management Company LLC, stylized aha!) was the brand used by regional airline ExpressJet for flights between Reno–Tahoe International Airport and cities along the West Coast of the United States.

Overview 
The brand name stands for "air-hotel-adventure" in reference to the company's plans to partner with resorts, casinos and attractions in Reno and Tahoe to “bundle” value-priced vacation packages. The company initially planned to serve each community three times a week with 50-seat Embraer ERJ 145 regional jets. Regular scheduled service began on October 24, 2021, from Reno to Pasco, Washington.

Aha!, together with its parent company ExpressJet, filed for Chapter 11 bankruptcy on August 22, 2022. Although Chapter 11 is typically used as protection while a debtor restructures, ExpressJet ceased all flight operations with plans to liquidate its assets.

Destinations 
Aha! operated from Reno–Tahoe International Airport to twelve smaller cities along the West Coast of the United States and had planned to expand to up to 20 destinations:

Fleet 

The aha! fleet operated the following aircraft during its existence:

References

External links 
aha! Homepage
ExpressJet Homepage

Defunct regional airlines of the United States
Airlines established in 2021
Airlines disestablished in 2022
Regional airlines
Low-cost carriers
Companies that filed for Chapter 11 bankruptcy in 2022